A creepmeter is an instrument that monitors the slow surface displacement of an active geologic fault in the earth. Its function is to record the slow, aseismic creep between earthquakes. The measurement range of a creepmeter is usually limited to 10–30 mm. Approximately 40 creepmeters are in operation in California—most are operated by the United States Geological Survey  (USGS), but nine are maintained by the University of Colorado.

References

Structural geology
Measuring instruments
Seismology